There are at least 73 named pillars in Montana:

 Alcatraz Rock, Fallon County, Montana, el. 
 Alp Rock, Park County, Montana, el. 
 Baker Monument, Fergus County, Montana, el. 
 Barking Dog, Lewis and Clark County, Montana, el. 
 Bear Tooth, Liberty County, Montana, el. 
 Big Rock, Glacier County, Montana, el. 
 Black Rock, Chouteau County, Montana, el. 
 Castle Rock, Powell County, Montana, el. 
 Castle Rock, Pondera County, Montana, el. 
 Castle Rock, Park County, Montana, el. 
 Castle Rock, Carter County, Montana, el. 
 Castle Rock Spire, Carbon County, Montana, el. 
 Castle Rocks, Phillips County, Montana, el. 
 Castle Rocks, Big Horn County, Montana, el. 
 Chimney Rock, Carter County, Montana, el. 
 Chimney Rock, Dawson County, Montana, el. 
 Chimney Rock, Park County, Montana, el. 
 Chimney Rock, Powder River County, Montana, el. 
 Chimney Rock, Park County, Montana, el. 
 Citadel Rock, Chouteau County, Montana, el. 
 Cleft Rock, Flathead County, Montana, el. 
 Crow Rock, Garfield County, Montana, el. 
 Cupids Heart, Gallatin County, Montana, el. 
 Dog Tooth Rock, Park County, Montana, el. 
 Dutch Oven, Garfield County, Montana, el. 
 Eagle Nest Rock, Park County, Montana, el. 

 Eagle Rock, McCone County, Montana, el. 
 Eagle Rock, Chouteau County, Montana, el. 
 Eagle Rock, Beaverhead County, Montana, el. 
 Eglise Rock, Madison County, Montana, el. 
 Elephant Rock, Meagher County, Montana, el. 
 Goat Rocks, Sanders County, Montana, el. 
 Goose Rock, Missoula County, Montana, el. 
 Haystack Butte, Chouteau County, Montana, el. 
 History Rock, Gallatin County, Montana, el. 
 Indian Head Rock, Jefferson County, Montana, el. 
 Indian Head Rock, Cascade County, Montana, coordinates unknown, el. 
 Indian Rock, Fergus County, Montana, el. 
 Jones Cone, Fergus County, Montana, el. 
 LaBarge Rock, Chouteau County, Montana, el. 
 Mil-mil-teh Hill, Meagher County, Montana, el. 
 Napi Rock, Glacier County, Montana, el. 
 Needle Butte, Rosebud County, Montana, el. 
 Peyton Rock, Ravalli County, Montana, el. 
 Pikes Peak, Valley County, Montana, el. 
 Pilot Rock, Chouteau County, Montana, el. 
 Pipe Organ Rock, Beaverhead County, Montana, el. 
 Point Stupid, Park County, Montana, el. 
 Point of Rocks, Flathead County, Montana, el. 
 Pompeys Pillar, Yellowstone County, Montana, el. 
 Prohibition Rock, Gallatin County, Montana, el. 
 Proposal Rock, Beaverhead County, Montana, el. 
 Pulpit Rock, Gallatin County, Montana, el. 
 Pumpelly Pillar, Glacier County, Montana, el. 
 Red Rock, Missoula County, Montana, el. 
 Road Agents Rock, Beaverhead County, Montana, el. 
 Sand Rocks, Blaine County, Montana, el. 
 Sentinel Rock, Lewis and Clark County, Montana, el. 
 Sheep Rock, Gallatin County, Montana, el. 
 Sheep Rock, Jefferson County, Montana, el. 
 Ship Rock, Chouteau County, Montana, el. 
 Signal Rock, Granite County, Montana, el. 
 Square Butte, Phillips County, el. 
 Stack Rocks, Carter County, Montana, el. 
 Stands Alone Woman Peak, Glacier County, Montana, el. 
 Steamboat Rock, Rosebud County, Montana, el. 
 Steamboat Rock, Beaverhead County, Montana, el. 
 Sugarloaf Rock, Fergus County, Montana, el. 
 The Bear, Park County, Montana, el. 
 The Castle, Meagher County, Montana, el. 
 The Chimneys, Phillips County, Montana, el. 
 The Needles, Meagher County, Montana, el. 
 The Painted Rock, Lewis and Clark County, Montana, el.

Notes

Pillars Of Montana
Pillars